The Eastern Star Home was a retirement home and convalescent facility in Los Angeles, California for the members of the Order of the Eastern Star, Master Masons and their female relatives. Built between 1931 and 1936, the home operated until the late 1990s when membership in the home had decreased precipitously to just 34 residents. "The retirement home moved to a new location, and the Order of the Eastern Star sold the property at Sunset Boulevard to Archer School for Girls."

San Francisco architect William Mooser II, and Train & Cressy, designed the building in the Spanish Colonial Revival style. When the cornerstone was laid October 17, 1931, Sunset Boulevard was still known as Beverly Boulevard and the neighborhood was called "Westgate Heights". The original floor plan had 56 singles and nine double rooms, as well as sitting rooms and sun porches on every level.

The original illuminated star was donated by the California Bethels of Job's Daughters in 1935.

The Eastern Star Home was a filming location for the 1974 Roman Polanski film Chinatown.

References 

Brentwood, Los Angeles
Los Angeles Historic-Cultural Monuments
Spanish Colonial Revival architecture in California
Buildings and structures on the National Register of Historic Places in Los Angeles
Order of the Eastern Star